Ninfa Marra (born 3 July 1974) is a Venezuelan former professional tennis player.

While competing on the professional tour during the 1990s, Marra reached a career high singles ranking of 333 and won an ITF tournament in Guayaquil, as well as three ITF doubles titles.

Marra represented the Venezuela Fed Cup team in 22 ties from 1991 to 1996, winning a total of 20 rubbers, 11 of which came in singles.

ITF finals

Singles: 5 (1–4)

Doubles: 7 (3–4)

References

External links
 
 
 

1974 births
Living people
Venezuelan female tennis players
Central American and Caribbean Games medalists in tennis
Central American and Caribbean Games gold medalists for Venezuela
Central American and Caribbean Games silver medalists for Venezuela
Central American and Caribbean Games bronze medalists for Venezuela
Tennis players at the 1991 Pan American Games
Pan American Games competitors for Venezuela
20th-century Venezuelan women
21st-century Venezuelan women